Christian Bourquin (7 October 1954 – 26 August 2014) was a French politician, a member of the Socialist Party. He was the president of the Regional Council of Languedoc-Roussillon from 2010 to his death in August 2014.

Biography
Bourquin was born at Saint-Féliu-d'Amont, Pyrenees-Orientales. He was elected Mayor of Millas in 1995, holding the post until 2001. Bourquin died of cancer, aged 59, at Montpellier, Hérault.

Elected office
 Deputy in the French National Assembly for the 3rd canton of Pyrénées-Orientales (1997 to 2002)
 Member of the PS National Office (2005 to 2008)
 General Council of Pyrénées-Orientales Canton of Millas, from 1994 to 2010.
 Chairman of the General Council of the Pyrénées-Orientales, from 1998 to 2010.
 1st vice-president of the Regional Council of Languedoc-Roussillon in charge of Finance from 2004 to 2010.
 After the death of Georges Frêche, president of the Languedoc-Roussillon region, in October 2010, six months after his reelection, Christian Bourquin was elected president.
 In September 2010, Bourquin was elected as senator for Pyrénées-Orientales constituency.

References

External links
Christian Bourquin official blog

1954 births
2014 deaths
People from Pyrénées-Orientales
Politicians from Occitania (administrative region)
Socialist Party (France) politicians
Deputies of the 11th National Assembly of the French Fifth Republic
French Senators of the Fifth Republic
Senators of Pyrénées-Orientales
Mayors of places in Occitania (administrative region)
Northern Catalonia